Lizano sauce is a Costa Rican condiment developed in 1920 by the Lizano company.  It is now a product of Unilever. It is a thin, smooth, light brown sauce (akin to such condiments as HP Sauce or Worcestershire sauce).

It is meant to be used while cooking or at tableside to flavor one's food when serving.  It is slightly sweet and acidic, with a hint of spiciness lent by black pepper and cumin.
 
The ingredients include water, sugar, salt, vegetables (onions, carrots, cauliflower, cucumbers), spices, pepper, mustard, turmeric, modified corn starch, hydrolized vegetable protein, sodium benzoate.

Many Costa Rican dishes are prepared with Lizano sauce, and it is ubiquitous on restaurant tables in its country of origin. It is commonly used with gallo pinto and tamales, and is also considered particularly complementary with eggs, rice, beans, fish, cheese, curries, and as a marinade for meat.

Lizano sauce is increasingly available commercially throughout North America through online retailers.

History  
The sauce was created initially by Próspero Jiménez in his bar in Alajuela. After success with the neighbors and acknowledging the success of imported bottled condiments, he approached Próspero Lizano who owned a factory, and then they established the brand and the green label for marketing. In 1991 Best Foods bought the company, and later were acquired by Unilever. In 2020, the condiment celebrated its 100th anniversary.

References

See also
 Costa Rican cuisine
 Piccalilli

Brand name condiments
Costa Rican cuisine